Phyllis Omido (born Phyllis Indiatsi Omido  1978), dubbed the "East African Erin Brockovich", is a Kenyan environmental activist. She was one of 6 people to be awarded the Goldman Environmental Prize in 2015. She is known for organizing protests against a lead smelting plant located in the middle of Owino Uhuru, a slum near Mombasa. The plant was causing lead poisoning by raising the lead content in the environment, killing residents, in particular children, and harming others, including her own child. The plant was ultimately closed.

She is the founder of the Centre for Justice, Governance and Environmental Action (CJGEA).

Personal life
Phyllis Omido was born in Kidinye Village, Vihiga County, to Margaret Omido and Alfred Omido. She has two brothers and a sister. Her eldest brother is George Mukutu. Omido's sister is named Susan Monyani Kasuki. Her youngest brother is Silas Enane.

Omido is a single,devoted mother of two children named Kingdavid Jeremiah Indiatsi and Margaret Esma Ehwa She studied Business Administration at the University of Nairobi and worked in industries in Kenya for more than 15 years.

Activism

Organization against the smelting plant
The plant started operations in 2009 in Owino Uhuru. It salvaged the lead from old car batteries. The result of the process was lead fumes which were released into the environment. Also, acid wastewater was not treated and was released into streams used by residents to bathe.

While working there as a community liaison officer, Omido commissioned an environmental impact assessment (EIA). The findings showed that the plant was releasing lead into the environment. As community relations officer, she made a recommendation that the smelter close and reopen elsewhere. Her superiors disagreed and reassigned her, bringing in a different consultant to finish the EIA.

Shortly after she started working at the smelter, Omido's baby became ill. She rushed him to hospital. They initially thought it was typhoid or malaria, but it was determined to be lead poisoning. She concluded that it must have been from the smelter. She selected three, random children and gave them blood tests. Each had levels of lead that were above the safe level according to the standards set by the US Centers for Disease Control and Prevention. She then quit her job and began her campaign to close the plant.

In 2012, Omido, along with her son, was accosted by armed men outside her home but managed to escape.

After getting no results from company leaders and government officials to close the plant, she organized a demonstration. She was arrested along with 16 other members of CJGEA while lobbying against toxic waste. The CJGEA offices were raided and police confiscated documents and computers. After spending a night in jail, she was charged with "inciting violence" and illegal gathering. After a lengthy court battle, a judge dismissed the case under section 210. The magistrate stated that she had acted within the law.

She then started to get help from Human Rights Watch and other groups. She met with the United Nations Special Rapporteur on toxic waste. This prompted the Kenyan Senate to come to the plant to assess the claims. The plant was finally closed in January 2014.

Centre for Justice, Governance and Environmental Action
In 2009, Omido founded The Centre for Justice, Governance and Environmental Action (CJGEA). Registered in Kilifi County and based in Mombasa, the organization was established to address environmental issues faced by the settlements near Kenya's industrial areas. In doing so, CJGEA has also become involved in addressing other issues, such as governance, policy change, and human rights. Programmes that the organization provides are climate change and environmental governance, activism and human rights, legal aid, and education.

CJGEA partnered with Human Rights Watch in the creation of a film on the poisoning of communities with toxic materials. It will focus on the death and health issues, as well as impunity and disregard for the environment and rule of law committed by the offenders. The film was launched on June 24, 2014 to coincide with the first UN Assembly on environment held in Nairobi.

Recent work
In February 2013, representing CJGEA, Omido attended a United Nations Environment Programme consultation forum on human rights and the environment, sponsored by the United Nations Environment Program.

In 2013 Omido represented Kenya's HRDs at Risk in Dublin, Ireland.

In 2014 she went to Geneva, Switzerland to attend the Universal Rights Group Consultative Forum for Environmental Human Rights Defenders.

From September 5 to 7, 2014, she attended the 3rd United Nations Institute for Training and Research-Yale Conference on Environmental Governance and Democracy at Yale University, New Haven, Connecticut.

On September 23, 2014, she was present at KIOS, the Finnish international human rights seminar.

She continues lobbying government. In 2014, three toxic waste smelters in poor, urban settlements were relocated to other parts of Mombasa.

In 2021, she was included in the Time 100, Times annual list of the 100 most influential people in the world.

Awards
Omido was one of six recipients of the 2015 Goldman Environmental Prize. The award is the largest in the world for grassroots activists whose cause is the environment. She received a trophy along with prize money of US$175,000 or 5.7 million Kenya Shillings.

Omido was on the list of the BBC's 100 Women announced on 23 November 2020.

Other accolades she has garnered during her activism years are:

References

External links
Centre for Justice, Governance and Environmental Action (CJGEA)

Kenyan environmentalists
Kenyan women environmentalists
Year of birth missing (living people)
Living people
University of Nairobi alumni
1970s births
BBC 100 Women
Goldman Environmental Prize awardees